The 1921 German football championship, the 14th edition of the competition, was won by 1. FC Nürnberg, defeating BFC Vorwärts 90 5–0 in the final.

For 1. FC Nürnberg it was the second national championship, having won the competition in the previous season as well. Nuremberg thereby became the first team to successfully defend their title. It was part of Nuremberg's most successful era where the club won five titles in eight seasons from 1920 to 1927, missing out on a sixth one in the inconclusive 1922 championship. For Vorwärts Berlin it marked the club's sole German championship final. The club, being unrelated to the East German club ASK Vorwärts Berlin, later merged with 1905 champions Union 92 Berlin to form SpVgg Blau-Weiß 1890 Berlin.

Nuremberg's Luitpold Popp was the top scorer of the 1921 championship with five goals.

Seven clubs qualified for the knock-out competition, nominally the champions of each of the seven regional football championships. However, the Baltic championship was later awarded to a different club, the VfB Königsberg.

Qualified teams
The teams qualified through the regional championships:

Competition

Quarter-finals
The quarter-finals, played on 22 May 1921:

|}
 1. FC Nürnberg received a bye for the quarter-finals

Semi-finals
The semi-finals, played on 29 May 1921:

|}

Final

References

Sources
 kicker Allmanach 1990, by kicker, page 160 to 178 – German championship
 Süddeutschlands Fussballgeschichte in Tabellenform 1897-1988  History of Southern German football in tables, publisher & author: Ludolf Hyll

External links
 German Championship 1920–21 at weltfussball.de 
 German Championship 1921 at RSSSF

1
German
German football championship seasons